Tripudia damozela is a species of moth in the family Noctuidae (the owlet moths). It was first described by Harrison Gray Dyar Jr. in 1914 and it is found in Central and North America.

The MONA or Hodges number for Tripudia damozela is 9002.2.

References

Further reading

 
 
 

Eustrotiinae
Articles created by Qbugbot
Moths described in 1914